The short-billed canastero (Asthenes baeri) is a species of bird in the family Furnariidae. It is found in Argentina, Bolivia, Brazil, Paraguay, and Uruguay. Its natural habitat is subtropical or tropical dry shrubland.

Three subspecies are recognized:
Asthenes baeri chacoensis Brodkorb, 1938 - Bolivia and Paraguay
Asthenes baeri baeri (Berlepsch, 1906) - Argentina, Bolivia, Brazil, Paraguay, and Uruguay
Asthenes baeri neiffi (Contreras, 1980) - Argentina

References

short-billed canastero
Birds of Argentina
Birds of Paraguay
Birds of Uruguay
short-billed canastero
short-billed canastero
Taxonomy articles created by Polbot